Age/Sex/Location is the second studio album by American singer and songwriter Ari Lennox. It was released on September 9, 2022, by Dreamville and Interscope Records. The album was executive produced by Dreamville producer Elite, and includes guest appearances from Lucky Daye, Chlöe, and Summer Walker.

Background
On August 31, 2022, J. Cole shared a message on Instagram asking Ari Lennox what the album means to her, to which she said: 

She has also compared the story of the album to Elizabeth Gilbert's memoir Eat, Pray, Love, saying "This is my eat pray love journey. And it's my honest goodbye to searching for love. I got it right here inside of me. The end of searching for anything other than self love and family. Pouring into me and giving the greatest love to me."

Release and promotion
On September 10, 2021, Ari Lennox released the single "Pressure", produced by Jermaine Dupri and Bryan-Michael Cox. The music video was released on September 11, 2021, and written and directed by Chandler Lass. It is partly an homage to singers Diana Ross and Donna Summer. The song became her first solo charting single on the Billboard Hot 100, her first Radio No. 1 single, and reached number 3 on R&B/Hip-Hop Airplay. 

On August 12, 2022, Ari Lennox released her second single "Hoodie", and announced the title and release date of the album. On August 31, she released the third single "Queen Space" featuring Summer Walker. Later that day, she released a surprise 5-track EP called Away Message, including songs that were recorded for the album but did not make the final cut. On September 7, she revealed the tracklist of the album, including features from Lucky Daye, Chlöe, and Summer Walker.

Critical reception

Upon its release, Age/Sex/Location was well-received by critics. Rolling Stone rated the album 4 out of 5 stars, "Time will tell whether age/sex/location wins over a mainstream audience or turns into one of those under-appreciated R&B albums that fans hoard decades later, like Amel Larrieux's Infinite Possibilities and Adriana Evans. No matter: age/sex/location deserves to be more than an overpriced Discogs collectable. She needs her flowers now." Uproxx wrote a positive review of the album saying "On Age/Sex/Location, Ari Lennox signs into a virtual world that could easily be her reality [...] As she navigates the twists, turns, risky climbs, and unprotected freefalls of her current "eat pray love" journey, it's with more discipline and increased wisdom from past missteps." 

Craig Jenkins of Vulture compared parts of the album to the likes of Erykah Badu on "POF", Dungeon Family on "Outside", Roberta Flack with "Pressure", and compared "Boy Bye" to Lauryn Hill and D'Angelo's "Nothing Even Matters" and Rihanna and Ne-Yo's "Hate That I Love You". Shifter Magazine highlighted the features on the album mentioning the chemistry between Ari and Lucky Daye on "Boy Bye", "leaving us wanting more male-female R&B/soul duets which appear to be less and less common", and "the blazing hot Chloë on 'Leak It' with a hint of 1960s R&B harmonies and Summer Walker". Praising the album in the review for AllMusic, Andy Kellman pointed out that "Most illuminating are the slow jams that, like a few songs off the debut, either repurpose or evoke mellow R&B and jazz grooves from the late '70s."

Track listing

Charts

References

Dreamville Records albums
2022 albums
Albums produced by J. Cole
Albums produced by Jermaine Dupri
Albums produced by Bryan-Michael Cox
Albums produced by Organized Noize